An annular solar eclipse will occur on October 2, 2024. A solar eclipse occurs when the Moon passes between Earth and the Sun, thereby totally or partly obscuring the image of the Sun for a viewer on Earth. An annular solar eclipse occurs when the Moon's apparent diameter is smaller than the Sun's, blocking most of the Sun's light and causing the Sun to look like an annulus (ring). An annular eclipse appears as a partial eclipse over a region of the Earth thousands of kilometres wide.

Other than Easter Island and a small portion near the southern tips of Argentina and Chile, the path of the eclipse's antumbra will be entirely over the Pacific Ocean. The penumbra will be visible from southern South America, Hawaii and portions of Antarctica. Eclipse magnitude is 0.93261, occurring only 56 minutes before apogee.

Images 
Animated path

Related eclipses

Eclipses of 2024 
 A penumbral lunar eclipse on March 25.
 A total solar eclipse on April 8.
 A partial lunar eclipse on September 18.
 An annular solar eclipse on October 2.

Solar eclipses of 2022–2025

Saros 144 

It is a part of Saros cycle 144, repeating every 18 years, 11 days, containing 70 events. The series started with partial solar eclipse on April 11, 1736. It contains annular eclipses from July 7, 1880 through August 27, 2565. There are no total eclipses in the series. The series ends at member 70 as a partial eclipse on May 5, 2980. The longest duration of annularity will be 9 minutes, 52 seconds on December 29, 2168.
<noinclude>

Tritos series

Metonic cycle

References

External links 

2024 10 2
2024 in science
2024 10 2
2024 10 2